Vergara is a small city in the Treinta y Tres Department of eastern Uruguay.

Geography
The stream Arroyo Parao flows along the northeast limits of the town.

History
On 10 March 1903, the group of houses here was declared a "Pueblo" (village) by the Act of Ley Nº 2.788. On 13 December 1994, its status was elevated to "Ciudad" (city) by the Act of Ley Nº 16.668

Population
In 2011, Vergara had a population of 3,810.
 
Source: Instituto Nacional de Estadística de Uruguay

Places of worship
 Most Holy Sacrament Parish Church (Roman Catholic)

References

External links
INE map of Vergara

Populated places in the Treinta y Tres Department